Katherine Henderson (born June 23, 1909; date of death unknown) was an American classic female blues singer. Most of her recording sessions took place in Long Island City, New York, in October and November 1928.

Career
Henderson was born in St. Louis, Missouri. She was the niece of Eva Taylor and Clarence Williams.

As a child, she performed in minstrel shows and on the vaudeville circuit. In the late 1920s, she recorded around ten songs, which were issued by Brunswick Records and QRS Records. In 1927, she starred in Bottomland, an ill-fated New York–based stage musical written by Williams. The show included the song "Take Your Black Bottom Dance Outside", which Henderson recorded. In 1928, she married John Jackson.

Henderson continued performing until 1944, long after her recording career was over.

According to Derrick Stewart-Baxter, Henderson's vocal style was marred by "more than a suspicion of ham", as "she put her material across in a rather lachrymose manner".

She was unrelated to Fletcher, Horace, Edmonia, and Rosa Henderson.

Selected discography

See also
List of classic female blues singers

References

External links
Katherine Henderson 1909-? Red Hot Jazz Archive
"West End Blues" on Youtube

1909 births
Year of death missing
Place of death missing
20th-century African-American women singers
American blues singers
Classic female blues singers
Brunswick Records artists
Musicians from St. Louis
Singers from Missouri